Louis Harper (23 April 1868 – 26 January 1940) was a civil engineer from the north-east of Scotland who designed a number of suspension footbridges towards the end of the 19th century.

Harper was born in Aberdeen, Aberdeenshire, to John Harper and Margaret Ross. His father came from Turriff in Aberdeenshire, and worked as a fencer in Edinburgh and Glasgow before starting the family firm in Aberdeen in 1856, which became Harpers Ltd in 1885. John Harper patented a mechanism for straining wire, used both to make fences and later also for the cables of bridges. His son John took charge of the business until 1887, while his second son Louis served an apprenticeship with Jenkins & Mar, Civil Engineers.

Louis set up his own firm in 1889, later collaborating with the contractors James Abernethy & Co. In addition to his bridge projects, he assisted Aberdeen Council in surveying their town water scheme. He became an Associate Member of the Institution of Civil Engineers in 1893, resigning in 1921.

The firm's early bridges included suspension bridges at Aboyne, spanning , and at Shocklach in Cheshire, both built in 1871. Neither bridge exists today. The early bridges had wooden towers, although these were replaced in later bridges by structural steel or cast iron members.

He died in Aberdeen in 1940.

Later bridges
Monymusk, 1879 over the River Don, Aberdeenshire,  span
Burnhervie, circa 1880, near Kemnay, collapsed 1979
Birkhall, 1880, Royal Deeside,  span
Cromdale, 1881 over the River Spey, collapsed and replaced by road bridge in 1922
Nairn, 1887, first bridge by Louis Harper
Crathorne Hall, 1888,  span, collapsed 1930 in flood
Bandon, County Cork, 1890,  span
Larbert, 1893 over the River Carron,  span
Feugh, 1893 near Banchory
Trentham, Staffordshire, 1893,  span, replaced in 1930s
Grimsby, 1894, three bridges
Sellack Boat, 1895, near Ross-on-Wye
Doveridge, 1898, replaced by a bridge by David Rowell & Co.
Keswick, Cumbria, 1898 over River Greta, demolished 1979
Narva, Estonia, circa 1898,  span
Newquay, 1900, about  span
Chundra Bridge, Chovar Gorge, Nepal, June 1903 (No longer in use)
 Sundari Footbridge, Nepal, in current use (2017)

A number of other bridges are proposed as having been designed by Louis Harper at the Harper Bridges website, although in the absence of clear documentary evidence, they are not listed above.

References

River, Railway and Ravine; foot suspension bridges for Empire. Douglas Harper 2015, The History Press  164pp.

External links
Harper Bridges

1868 births
1940 deaths
People from Aberdeen
British bridge engineers
Scottish civil engineers